The 1903 Challenge Cup was the 7th staging of rugby league's oldest knockout competition, the Challenge Cup. It featured clubs from the 1902-03 Northern Rugby Football Union season.

First round

Second round

Third round

Quarterfinals

Semifinals

Final

The final was contested by Halifax and Salford at Headingley Stadium in Leeds. on Saturday 25 April 1903,  in front of a crowd of 32,507. Halifax were victorious, beating Salford 7–0.

References

External links
Challenge Cup official website 
Challenge Cup 1902/03 results at Rugby League Project

Challenge Cup
Challenge Cup